Hu Yadan (19 January 1996) is a Chinese diver.

See also
China at the 2012 Summer Olympics - Diving
Diving at the 2012 Summer Olympics – Women's 10 metre platform

References 

1996 births
Living people
Chinese female divers
Divers at the 2012 Summer Olympics
Olympic divers of China
Sportspeople from Sichuan
Asian Games medalists in diving
People from Zigong
Divers at the 2010 Asian Games
Asian Games gold medalists for China
Medalists at the 2010 Asian Games
21st-century Chinese women